Arendalsfeltet is a geologic province in Norway, between  Fevik and Tvedestrand in the county of Aust-Agder, mainly situated within the borders of Arendal. Arendalsfeltet is especially known for its deposits of iron ore.

The first extraction of iron ore from Arendalsfeltet was in around 1585 and mining continued until 1975. The iron ore was of high quality and was much in demand from the old Norwegian iron works, around 2/3 of the iron ore they used came from Arendalsfeltet.

Books 

 J.H.L. Vogt, Norges Jernmalmforekomster, Christiania 1908, Norges geologiske undersøkelse, 51
 J.H.L. Vogt, De gamle norske jernverk, Christiania 1908, Norges geologiske undersøkelse, 46
 Molden Gunnar, Simonsen, Jan Henrik: Jerngruvedrift i Arendalsfeltet, Økomuseum Skagerrak 1994, 

Geologic provinces
Mining in Norway